Yamoussoukro International Airport is a regional airport serving Yamoussoukro in Côte d'Ivoire.

On November 6, 2004, Yamoussoukro Airport was attacked by French infantry after military aircraft from the airport bombed a UN peacekeeper base as well as rebel targets, 9 French peacekeepers and one U.S. civilian were killed. Two Ivory Coast Sukhoi Su-25 aircraft and several Mil Mi-24 helicopters were destroyed, which was most of the country's air forces. Mobs and rebels  tried to attack the French forces after the airport raid.

References

 Great Circle Mapper - Yamoussoukro

Airports in Ivory Coast
Buildings and structures in Yamoussoukro